Calumma vatosoa is a species of chameleon found in Madagascar.

References

Calumma
Reptiles of Madagascar
Reptiles described in 2001